Horace Micallef (born 20 September 1959) is a Maltese sports shooter. He competed in the mixed trap event at the 1992 Summer Olympics.

References

External links
 

1959 births
Living people
Maltese male sport shooters
Olympic shooters of Malta
Shooters at the 1992 Summer Olympics
Place of birth missing (living people)